The Russian Mixed Curling Championship is the national championship of mixed curling (two men and two women) in Russia. It has been held annually since 2006, organized by Russian Curling Federation.

List of champions and medallists
(teams line-up in order: skip/fourth, third, second, lead, alternate, coach)

All time medals
One common table for men and women players (on any position - not "skips only"). As of the conclusion of the 2020 Russian Mixed Curling Championship.

References

See also
Russian Men's Curling Championship
Russian Women's Curling Championship
Russian Mixed Doubles Curling Championship
Russian Junior Curling Championships
Russian Senior Curling Championships
Russian Wheelchair Curling Championship
Russian Mixed Curling Cup